Judge William Hancock may refer to William Hancock Sr., or his son William Hancock Jr.

William Hancock Sr. 

William H. Hancock was a Justice of the Peace for the County of Salem in 1727, and a member of the colonial legislature.
He commissioned Hancock House (Lower Alloways Creek Township, New Jersey) in 1734.
The house was erected in 1734 for William Hancock and his wife Sarah, whose initials are woven into the gable on the west end.

Died 1762

William Hancock Jr. 
When William Sr. died in 1762, the house passed to his son William, who also succeeded his father in the legislature and as a Judge of the County Court of Pleas in Salem County.
He presided over the King's Court at the Salem County Courthouse.
He died as a result of wounds received on the night of March 20, 1778, in the "Hancock's Bridge massacre".

See also 
Hancock House (Lower Alloways Creek Township, New Jersey)
Hancock's Bridge, New Jersey
Lower Alloways Creek Township, New Jersey
Salem County, New Jersey
Salem, New Jersey

References

External links 
Hancock House brochure, www.state.nj.us

American judges
Members of the New Jersey General Assembly
People from Salem County, New Jersey